Kwadia (Kodia) is a minor Kru language of Ivory Coast.

References

Kru languages
Languages of Ivory Coast